U.S. Route 41 (US 41) in the U.S. state of Illinois runs north from the Indiana border beneath the Chicago Skyway on Indianapolis Boulevard to the Wisconsin border north of the northern terminus of the Tri-State Tollway with Interstate 94. It is the only north–south U.S. Route to travel through a significant portion of the city of Chicago, carrying Lake Shore Drive through the central portion of the city along the lakefront.

Route description

US 41 enters Illinois running concurrently with US 12 and US 20 on the far southeast side of Chicago. They run together until the junction of 95th Street and Ewing Avenue. US 41, then continues down Ewing Avenue for  before heading northwest–southeast along the extension of Lake Shore Drive. Lake Shore Drive continues until US 41 meets South Shore Drive and 79th Street. This is the western terminus of the Lake Shore Drive extension and US 41 continues through the South Shore neighborhood's section of South Shore Drive before reaching the southern terminus of Lake Shore Drive.

The Lake Shore Drive section of US 41 is a six- to eight-lane highway along the shores of Lake Michigan through Chicago's lakefront park system. It is a limited-access highway except for five signalized intersections near downtown Chicago.

Just short of the northern terminus of Lake Shore Drive, US 41 exits at Foster Avenue. Between Lake Shore Drive and Lincolnwood, US 41 intersects US 14 twice; once at its terminus at Foster Avenue and Broadway, and once again at the intersection of Peterson Avenue and Lincoln Avenue.

US 41 is named Skokie Boulevard through Skokie, then its name changes to Skokie Valley Road north of Skokie. Traveling north, it joins I-94 (Edens Expressway) westbound just north of the Old Orchard Shopping Center; they split a few miles north when US 41 becomes the Skokie Highway. The highway serves as a major north–south arterial expressway for much of its routing through Chicago's northern suburbs, as well as an oft-used alternate for truckers avoiding the cost of tolls on the Tri-State Tollway. Before reaching the Wisconsin border, US 41 rejoins I-94 at the northern terminus of the Tri-State Tollway; these two roads continue, toll-free, north  to the Wisconsin border.

History
Initially, US 41 followed what used to be Illinois Route 42. In 1931, it was rerouted away from Zion and Winthrop Harbor while IL 42 north of Chicago remained untouched. In 1935, an entire section of US 41 between Chicago and Waukegan was realigned to a new alignment. The new alignment closely matched the current routing of US 41. By 1939, Skokie Highway (part of US 41) was fully completed. With the completion of the Edens Expressway in 1951, US 41 was moved onto the expressway north of Touhy Avenue. Eventually, in 1959, Interstate 94 appeared on the Edens Expressway as well as the Edens Spur and part of the Tri-State Tollway. In 1966, US 41 was rerouted back onto Skokie Boulevard. In 1987, the S-curve was straightened out. By 1997, the northbound lanes were moved west to the southbound lanes; eliminating the split at Museum Campus. Around that same year, the overpass north of I-55 became fully pedestrianized in favor of expanding McCormick Place.

A $64 million Lake Shore Drive extension project, spanning from 79th Street to 92nd Street/Ewing Avenue/Harbor Avenue junctions, began in April 2012. Unlike the northern portion of LSD, the extension would function more like an arterial road instead of a limited-access road. Previously, a portion of U.S. Route 41 used to travel north through Mackinaw Avenue, west through 87th Street, north through Burley Avenue, west through 85th Street, northwest through Baker Avenue, and north through South Shore Drive until it reached 79th Street. The extension eventually opened on October 27, 2013. As a result, US 41 moved eastward onto the new road.

Major intersections

See also

Notes

References

External links

 Illinois
41
Transportation in Chicago
Transportation in Cook County, Illinois
Transportation in Lake County, Illinois